The Reading Masters was a greyhound competition held at Reading Stadium.

The race was held from 1992 until 2007 and the prize money was second only to the English Greyhound Derby. The large prize money fund came virtue of sponsorship by the track bookmakers.

Past winners

Discontinued

References

External links
British Greyhound Racing Board

Greyhound racing competitions in the United Kingdom
Recurring sporting events established in 1992
Sport in Reading, Berkshire